James "Hollywood" Robinson (born August 31, 1970) is a former American professional basketball player, most notably in the National Basketball Association (NBA). He is currently the head coach of the Vegas Ballers of TBL.

Robinson, an undersized 6 ft 2 in (1.88 m) shooting guard, attended the University of Alabama before being selected with the 21st overall pick in the 1993 NBA draft by the Portland Trail Blazers.

High school & college
As a high school star at Jackson, Mississippi's Murrah High School, Robinson played with another future NBA player, Lindsey Hunter.

Robinson was named Mississippi Mr. Basketball & was named a McDonald's All American in the same group that included such notable players as Kenny Anderson, Shaquille O'Neal, Jim Jackson, and Allan Houston. Robinson also won the All American slam dunk contest. He signed with Alabama, but was ineligible under the NCAA's Proposition 48 academic entrance guidelines. He redshirted, and after sitting out for a season he started play for the Crimson Tide in the 1991-92 season. As a redshirt freshman, Robinson came off the bench to average a team high 16.8 points per game, becoming the first freshman to lead the Tide in scoring since 1953.

As a junior at Alabama in 1992–93, Robinson led the Crimson Tide with 20.6 points per game, also tallying 4.5 rebounds and 2.3 assists per contest, and was named to the All-Southeastern Conference First Team. He set a school record by scoring 20 or more points in 12 straight games and became the first junior in Crimson Tide history to surpass 1,500 career points (he finished with 1,831). During his college career he played with two future NBA players, Latrell Sprewell and Robert Horry.

Robinson's scoring average was the highest at Alabama since Buck Johnson's 20.7 in 1986. After such a stellar year, Robinson elected to pass up his senior season and enter the 1993 NBA draft.

NBA
Robinson had an uneventful first professional season (58 games with 11 minutes per game), although he did compete in the NBA Slam Dunk Contest at the NBA All-Star Weekend, where he finished in last place (6th).  He also has the distinction of being one of three Robinsons that the Portland Trail Blazers had on its roster in the 1995–96 NBA season, the others being Clifford Robinson and Rumeal Robinson.  Robinson's importance in Portland increased from 1994–96, as Clyde Drexler was traded to Houston midway through 1994–95 and Terry Porter was often injured the following season. After that season, he was traded, along with Bill Curley and a conditional first-round pick to the Minnesota Timberwolves, for Isaiah Rider.

As a Timberwolf, Robinson achieved roughly the same averages than his final two Portland years, albeit in less playing time. In 1997–98, he signed as a free agent with the Los Angeles Clippers, and posted similar numbers (almost 8 ppg in 84 games). Waived in March 1999, he would rejoin the Timberwolves, with little impact.

Midway through 2000–01, after one season of absence, Robinson received a ten-day contract with the Orlando Magic, eventually his last NBA stint.

Career statistics

Trades and contracts
July 23, 1996 – Traded by the Blazers with Bill Curley and a conditional first round draft pick in 1997 or 1998 to the Minnesota Timberwolves for Isaiah "J.R." Rider.
August 16, 1997 – Signed as a free agent by the Los Angeles Clippers; March 18, 1999 – waived
March 26, 1999 – Signed to the first of two consecutive 10-day contracts by the Minnesota Timberwolves; April 17, 1999 – signed for the remainder of the season

References

External links

1970 births
Living people
African-American basketball players
Alabama Crimson Tide men's basketball players
American expatriate basketball people in Greece
American expatriate basketball people in Italy
American expatriate basketball people in Russia
American men's basketball players
Basketball players from Jackson, Mississippi
Greek Basket League players
Los Angeles Clippers players
McDonald's High School All-Americans
Minnesota Timberwolves players
Olympiacos B.C. players
Orlandina Basket players
Orlando Magic players
Parade High School All-Americans (boys' basketball)
PBC CSKA Moscow players
Portland Trail Blazers draft picks
Portland Trail Blazers players
Shooting guards
21st-century African-American sportspeople
20th-century African-American sportspeople